Moravica ("little Morava") may refer to several places:

 Moravica District in Serbia
 Golijska Moravica, river in western Serbia
 Sokobanjska Moravica, river in eastern Serbia
 Preševska Moravica, river in southern Serbia, a source of the South Morava
 Stara Moravica, a village near Bačka Topola, Serbia

See also
 Morava (disambiguation)
 Moravice (disambiguation)